William Henry Brooke (1772–1860) was a British artist and illustrator.

Life
He was the son of the painter Henry Brooke and a nephew of Henry Brooke, the author of A Fool of Quality. He was a pupil of Samuel Drummond, and worked as a portrait painter.

He exhibited portraits and figure subjects at the Royal Academy occasionally between 1810 and 1826, but is best known by his illustrations to books. He died at Chichester in 1860.

Works
As an illustrator, Brooke was influenced by Thomas Stothard, a friend. He contributed to Thomas Moore's Irish Melodies, Izaak Walton's Compleat Angler in the edition by John Major, Thomas Keightley's Mythology, and other works.

References

Other sources

External links
 

1772 births
1860 deaths
19th-century Irish painters
Irish male painters
Irish illustrators
19th-century Irish male artists